3rdburglar is the third studio album by Canadian rapper Wordburglar.

Track listing

References

2012 albums